Carlow is a barony in County Carlow, Republic of Ireland.

Etymology
Carlow barony takes its name from the town of Carlow (of disputed meaning).

Location
Carlow barony is bordered to the east by Rathvilly; to the southeast by Forth; to the south by Idrone East; to the southeast by Idrone West (all the preceding baronies are also in County Carlow); to the north by Kilkea and Moone, County Kildare; and to the northwest by Slievemargy, County Laois.

History
The Uí Bairrche are noted early in this barony. The O'Dolans were hereditary brehons of Leinster and sited here.

List of settlements

Below is a list of settlements in Carlow barony:
Carlow

References

Baronies of County Carlow